This article details the Hull Kingston Rovers rugby league football club's 2013 season. This is the 18th season of the Super League era.

Pre season friendlies

Hull KR score is first.

Table

2013 fixtures and results

2013 Engage Super League

Challenge Cup

Playoffs

2013 transfers in/out

In

Out

References

External links
Hull KR on Sky Sports
Hull KR on Super League Site
BBC Sport-Rugby League

Hull Kingston Rovers seasons
Hull KR